John Alexander Lachlan Shaw  (26 August 1902 – 20 April 1983) was an Australian engineer and New South Wales public servant.

Early life and education

John Shaw was born on 26 August 1902 in Marrickville, New South Wales, the son of John and Alice Shaw. He attended Sydney Technical High School and thereafter studied civil engineering at the University of Sydney. After graduating with honours with a Bachelor of Engineering (BE) in 1925, Shaw was recruited into newly established Main Roads Board of New South Wales, which was a part of the NSW Department of Main Roads. In 1928 he was included amongst the first six divisional engineer appointments made by the Board, taking up postings at Glen Innes, Newcastle and Sydney. In 1926 he married Nellie Hicks in Chatswood.

Military service
When the Second World War broke out, Shaw enlisted on 8 July 1940 in the 2/12 Field Company, Royal Australian Engineers. As part of the 8th Division in the Second Australian Imperial Force, Shaw was sent over in February 1941 to Malaya to assist in the defence of Singapore. He surrendered along with all allied forces in Malaya on 31 January 1942 and was taken prisoner, being held in the notorious Changi Prison. Liberated at the end of the war, he was discharged on 24 January 1946 with the rank of major. On 6 March 1947 for "Organisation, courage and coolness in Malaya" he was awarded the Distinguished Service Order (DSO). He was presented with his award by the Governor-General of Australia, Sir William McKell, on 24 January 1949 at Admiralty House, Sydney.

Later career and legacy
On returning to civilian life in Australia, Shaw resumed his work with the then Department of Main Roads, rising to Assistant Commissioner in 1953 and overseeing various post-war infrastructure projects such as the Gladesville Bridge, where he served as Chief Engineer. Shaw eventually rose to the office of Commissioner for Main Roads from 20 April 1962 to 1967. As Commissioner, on 12 June 1966 he was invested as a Commander of the Order of the British Empire (CBE).

After his retirement John Shaw served as the Deputy Chief Commissioner of the City of Sydney from its dismissal by the Askin Government on 14 November 1967 to 26 September 1969. Shaw also served as the National President of the Australian Road Federation from 1968 to 1979. He is the only Australian ever to have been honoured by the International Road Federation as "Man of the Year".

The "John Shaw Award", which was initiated in the Queensland Region of the Australian Road Federation, acknowledges his outstanding contribution to roads. Roads Australia has an award in his honour. The "John Shaw Medal" is considered as one of the most significant achievements in the Australian Road Transport Sector. In 1991, his son established the "JAL and DL Shaw Award" with the gift of $10 000 in memory of his father, for graduates of the University of Sydney Faculty of Engineering and Information Technologies.

References

1902 births
1983 deaths
Australian Army officers
Australian Commanders of the Order of the British Empire
Australian Companions of the Distinguished Service Order
20th-century Australian engineers
Australian military personnel of World War II
Australian prisoners of war
Public servants of New South Wales
Executive directors of government departments of New South Wales
People educated at Sydney Technical High School
University of Sydney alumni
World War II prisoners of war held by Japan
People from Marrickville
Councillors of Sydney County Council